The Bratislava Monarchs are an American football team from Bratislava, Slovakia, established in 1996. Today, the Monarchs are competing in the Austrian Football League.

History

Establishment
The interest in American football in Slovakia grew rapidly after the first television broadcasts of the National Football League season in 1993. The first meetings of several people who threw football began in the summer of 1994 in Bratislava. The number of new players each week increased, and at the end of the year was over 30 people. The club was officially founded on April 1, 1996, and was the very first American football club in Slovakia. Shortly thereafter, all major cities in Slovakia started with the establishment of new clubs.

The first game of the Monarchs was played in the spring of 2004 with helmets and shoulder pads, against the Kragujevac Wild Boars, which they won. During 2008, the Monarchs played in the Central European Football League, where they competed against the CNC Gladiators from Austria, Budapest Wolves and Budapest Cowboys from Hungary, Ljubljana Silverhawks from Slovenia, Belgrade Vukovi and Novi Sad Dukes from Serbia, and Zagreb Thunder from Croatia.

2011: Bratislava's first major title
The First league game in Slovakia was played in 2011 and 5 teams competed that year. This league was played with necessary equipment, pads and helmets. The Final game of the Slovak Football League was played on August 6th, 2011 at the ŠKP Štadión, where they defeated the Nitra Knights, 21-6.

2012: Bratislava's second major title
The 2012 season is well started for the Monarchs, where the opponents have been falling in the order in the Slovak Football League. The Monarchs won again in the Slovak Football League finals against the Trnava Bulldogs, 38-31. Their previous opponents, the Nitra Knights, finished third.

2013–2014: Bratislava's Bronze Medal and Fourth Place Finish
The Monarchs have started the season with a preseason game (with future Austrian Football League champions) Danube Dragons, and lost in an exciting finish 30-27. The Season continues with games in the Slovak Football League, where they finished 3rd, in which the Smolenice Eagles beat the Nitra Knights.

Despite a successful start of the 2014 Slovak Football League season, the Monarchs failed to make to the Slovak Football League finals, where the Smolenice Eagles beat the Žilina Warriors, and the Zvolen Patriots, the team that the Monarchs defeated them, emerged as the bronze medalists.

2015: The Cinderella year of the Monarchs
The Monarchs entered the 2015 Slovak Football League season with their new head coach, Christoph Dreyer. The Monarchs finally fulfilled their Cinderella story when they won their third Slovak Football League title after defeating the Trnava Bulldogs, 48-26. The Monarchs also became the first team outside Hungary to win the Hungarian Football League by beating the Budapest Wolves.

Season Stats

Slovak Bowl Results

Hungarian Bowl Results

Honours
 Slovak Bowl
 Champions: (3) 2015, 2017, 2019
 Hungarian Bowl 
 Champions: (1) 2015
 Silver Bowl 
 Champions: (1) 2017

References

External links

American football teams in Europe
American football teams established in 1996
Sport in Bratislava
1996 establishments in Slovakia